Kawkab (also spelled Kaukab or Kokab) may refer to:

Places

Lebanon
 Kaukaba, a village in the Nabatieh Governorate, Southern Lebanon

Israel/Palestine
 Kaukab Abu al-Hija, a village in the Galilee, northern Israel
 Kawkab al-Hawa - a depopulated Palestinian village in the Jordan Valley, northern Israel
 Kawkaba - a depopulated Palestinian village in the Gaza subdistrict

Syria
 Kaukab es-Soueid - in Salamiyah District of the Hama Governorate, SSE of Hama on the road to Palmyra
Kawkab, Hama - village in Hama Governorate, north of Hama
Kawkab, Rif Dimashq - village in Qatana District of the Rif Dimashq Governorate
Kawkab military base - a military base in Al-Hasakah Governorate

Yemen
 Kawkab, Yemen, village in Yemen

Other
 Kawkab Marrakech, an association football club in Morocco
Kaukab Stewart, British politician